Progress Rail Services Corporation , a fully owned subsidiary of Caterpillar since 2006, is a supplier of railroad and transit system products and services headquartered in Albertville, Alabama. Founded as a recycling company in 1982, Progress Rail has increased the number of its product and service offerings over time to become one of the largest integrated and diversified suppliers of railroad and transit system products and services in North America. Progress Rail markets products and services worldwide and maintains 110 facilities in the United States, 34 in Mexico, 4 in Canada, 2 in Brazil, 5 in UK, 1 in Italy, and 1 in Germany. Progress Rail is organized into two divisions: Infrastructure and Rolling Stock.

History
"Progress Rail" traces its roots to a recycling company founded in Albertville, Alabama, United States in 1982.
With the merger of Progress Rail's owner Florida Progress Corporation and Carolina Power & Light Company in 2000, it became owned by the new entity Progress Energy.

In February 2005, Progress Energy announced it was selling Progress Rail to One Equity Partners for $405 million. The sale closed on March 28, 2005, with Progress Rail becoming a separate private company.

On May 17, 2006, Caterpillar Inc. announced it would purchase Progress Rail from One Equity Partners for $1 billion in cash, stock and debt. The acquisition by Caterpillar was announced as part of its long-term strategy, Vision 2020.

In July 2011, the company announced it was to assemble EMD locomotives at a plant leased in the state of Minas Gerais, Brazil.

Acquisitions

On May 24, 2008 Caterpillar agreed to acquire all of the capital stock of MGE - Equipamentos e Serviços Ferroviários Ltda., a São Paulo, Brazil-based locomotive component and transit car services company to become part of Caterpillar's Progress Rail Services Corporation. The acquisition of MGE marked Progress Rail's first entry into the South American market.

On June 1, 2010, Caterpillar announced Progress Rail would buy Electro-Motive Diesel from Berkshire Partners LLC and Greenbriar Equity Group LLC for US$820 million. The purchase was completed on August 2, 2010, making Electro-Motive Diesel a wholly owned subsidiary of Progress Rail Services Corporation.

During 2010, Progress Rail acquired two makers of signal equipment, Coast to Coast Signal Engineering and C&S Signaling, as well as a General Electric subsidiary involved in the signal industry; now Progress Rail Inspection & Information Systems.

In February 2012 Progress Rail permanently closed the EMD London, Ontario plant after labour dispute shuttered the manufacturing plant.
In 2019, Progress Rail acquired Cleveland Track Material, Inc. which was a subsidiary of Vossloh Cogifer.

Federal investigation
During October 2013, Caterpillar announced that a federal criminal indictment had been secured against Progress Rail Services. In 2017, the company pleaded guilty to the charges, including dumping parts into the ocean. A $5,000,000 fine was paid as well as $20,000,000 in restitution.

Products

Locomotives

Progress Rail currently offers EMD freight, passenger, repowered and used locomotives.

 Progress Rail PR22L
 Progress Rail PR30C
 Progress Rail PR43C

Signals
Progress Rail's Signal Division makes grade crossing and wayside signals.

References

External links
 , company website

Caterpillar Inc. subsidiaries
Companies based in Albertville, Alabama
Manufacturing companies established in 1982
Locomotive manufacturers of the United States
Railway signalling manufacturers
Rail infrastructure manufacturers
1982 establishments in Alabama